Dongdajie is a metro station of Zhengzhou Metro Line 2 and Line 3.

This station became an interchange station between Line 2 and Line 3 after Line 3 started operation in 2020.

Station layout

Exits

References 

Stations of Zhengzhou Metro
Line 2, Zhengzhou Metro
Line 3, Zhengzhou Metro